Colorectal mutant cancer protein is a protein that in humans is encoded by the MCC gene.

This gene is a candidate colorectal tumor suppressor gene that is thought to negatively regulate cell cycle progression. The orthologous gene in the mouse expresses a phosphoprotein associated with the plasma membrane and membrane organelles, and overexpression of the mouse protein inhibits entry into S phase. Multiple transcript variants encoding different  isoforms have been found for this gene.

References

Further reading